Iris graeberiana is a species in the genus Iris, in the subgenus of Scorpiris.  It is a bulbous perennial.

Description
 
It has pale silvery mauve flowers. It also comes in blueish-lavender, or blue-violet shades.
Which is surrounded by a pale, boldly veined zone.

The white margined leaves, have glossy mid-green tops, but with greyish green bottoms, which are scattered along the stem.

Taxonomy
It was named after Paul Graeber (a plant collector who also collected Iris hoogiana and Tulipa ostrowskiana for the Dutch Van Tubergen company).

It was first published in Botanical Magazine Vol.167 on table 126 by Sealy in 1950.

Iris graeberiana is an accepted name by the RHS,
and the iris is recognized by the United States Department of Agriculture and the Agricultural Research Service, since 2003.

Distribution and habitat
It is native to Tajikistan, and Turkestan (parts of the former republic of USSR) in Central Asia.

Cultivation
It is known as one of the more vigorous species, therefore is easier to grow the others in the subgenus. It is also hardy to USDA Zone 5–8.

They are best grown in well-drained soils  in open, stony places or an Alpine house, but some growers recommend outside culture, if sheltered from heavy summer rains. The plant attracts birds and butterflies.

It can be seen growing in Le Grand Clos botanical garden in Bourgueil, France.

Known hybrids
Iris graeberiana 'White fall', 
It is thought to have been bred by crossing Iris graeberiana with Iris magnifica.
Iris graeberiana 'Yellow fall',
Iris graeberiana 'Dark Form' ; a more hardy plant but with smaller darker flowers. It is similar to Iris zenaidae but with smaller flowers.

References

Other sources
 S. K. Czerepanov, 1995. Vascular plants of Russia and adjacent states (the former USSR) Cambridge University Press. (note: listed as Iris graberana Sealy)
 Walter Erhardt, Erich Götz, Nils Bödeker, Siegmund Seybold: Der große Zander. Eugen Ulmer KG, Stuttgart 2008, . (Ger.) 
 Brian Mathew, 1981. Iris, 

graeberiana
Plants described in 1853
Flora of Tajikistan
Flora of Central Asia